Russell Perry may refer to:

 Russell Perry (politician) (1915–1981), civil servant, merchant and political figure on Prince Edward Island
 Russell M. Perry, American businessman, banker, publisher, and broadcaster from Oklahoma
 Russell Perry (weightlifter), Australian weightlifter